Mithra  is a village in Kapurthala district of Punjab State, India. The village is administrated by a Sarpanch who is an elected representative of village as per the constitution of India and Panchayati raj (India).

Demography 
According to the report published by Census India in 2011, Mithra has total number of 80 houses and population of 350 of which include 185 males and 165 females. Literacy rate of Mithra is 71.88%, lower than state average of 75.84%.  The population of children under the age of 6 years is 30 which is 8.57% of total population of Mithra, and child sex ratio is approximately  875, higher than state average of 846.

Population data

Air travel connectivity 
The closest airport to the village is Sri Guru Ram Dass Jee International Airport.

Villages in Kapurthala

References

External links
  Villages in Kapurthala

Villages in Kapurthala district